is a Filipino Japanese TV personality, host, actress & pianist who gained media attention as a finalist on the 5th season of StarStruck, a reality-TV talent show broadcast on GMA Network.

Personal life
Kodaka lived in Japan before joining StarStruck.  On Startalk, after her elimination, she is the co-host in "Startalk" which is longest news show in the Philippines.

StarStruck V
Kodaka was one of the eight finalists who auditioned abroad. She advanced to the final 14 alongside Zeryl Lim (who auditioned in the Middle East) and Rye Burgos (who auditioned in the United States.)She was top 3 of the girls, her batch mates are Sarah Lahbati, Diva Montelava, Rocco Nacino, Enzo Pineda, Steven Silva.

Filmography
TV Shows

Movies

See also
 at iGMA.tv
 at IMDB.com
 at cchan.tv (search:Nina)

References

1989 births
Living people
Japanese television personalities
People from Tokyo
Filipino people of Japanese descent
Participants in Philippine reality television series
StarStruck (Philippine TV series) participants
GMA Network personalities